Johnny Mathis is the first studio album by vocalist Johnny Mathis that was released by Columbia Records in 1956. The subtitle A New Sound in Popular Song can be found on the back cover but not on the front of the album or the disc label; in fact, this Mathis LP has been referred to as "the jazz album".

This release did not make it onto Billboard magazine's  Best Selling Pop Albums chart, which had 15 positions available at the time.

Columbia/Legacy released the album on compact disc for the first time as a 40th Anniversary Edition on May 7, 1996, and included a previously unreleased recording of "I'm Glad There Is You".

In the UK the album was originally issued by Fontana Records with alternate artwork and a different track listing. On May 14, 2001, this version had its first pressing on compact disc as one of two albums on one CD, the other album being its 1957 follow-up, Wonderful Wonderful.

History
In the liner notes for the original album, Columbia Records executive and album producer George Avakian wrote of a visit to a nightclub to hear Mathis during a trip to San Francisco in the summer of 1955: "I gave in to the blandishments of my good friend Helen Noga... and agreed to go listen to a 19-year-old local boy." The young singer's talent was immediately apparent: "Before Johnny finished his second song, I knew I was going to sign him.... Obviously he had more training than most pop singers; his extraordinary breath control and sweeping range indicated that. He could do as many different things as four very different singers might, and do them well. All he needed was experience and seasoning." Avakian knew this would take time and returned in January 1956 to see how his skills were developing. "Johnny's repertoire, already unusually broad, had grown enormously, and so had his poise and control. He had learned what to do with his hands, how to make and maintain close contact with his audience, and to program his songs most effectively. Best of all, he had grown so much in quality that I had no doubt that the time had come to record."

Avakian also described what he had in mind for this project: "I visualized a series of intimate small-band sessions with a variety of arrangers, each given carte blanche as to instrumentation and treatment within the overall interpretation of each song as taped as a guide by Johnny in San Francisco." As the head of the jazz department at Columbia, however, he had developed an ear for that vocal style. "Johnny's singing is thoroughly jazz-oriented, so naturally arrangers were chosen who had a thorough command of the jazz idiom, as well as the ability to write imaginatively for a pop vocalist." He explained that these arrangers had "done a certain amount of what might be called experimental writing. Under the circumstances, it is not surprising that these arrangements contain many elements seldom encountered in pop vocal accompaniments."

Despite this album's failure to chart, Avakian also produced the Wonderful Wonderful LP for Mathis the following year.

Track listing (US)

Side one
"Autumn in Rome" (Sammy Cahn, Alessandro Cicognini, Paul Weston) – 3:56
"Easy to Love" from Born to Dance (Cole Porter) – 2:29
"Street of Dreams"   (Victor Young, Sam M. Lewis) – 2:15
"Love, Your Magic Spell is Everywhere" from The Trespasser (Edmund Goulding, Elsie Janis) – 2:59
"Prelude to a Kiss" (Duke Ellington, Irving Mills, Irving Gordon) – 4:26
"Babalu" (Margarita Lecuona) – 2:47

Side two
"Caravan" (Juan Tizol, Duke Ellington, Irving Mills) – 3:59
"In Other Words (Fly Me to the Moon)" (Bart Howard) – 3:52
"Star Eyes" from I Dood It (Don Raye, Gene DePaul) – 2:48
"It Might as Well Be Spring" from State Fair (Richard Rodgers, Oscar Hammerstein II) – 4:47
"Cabin in the Sky" from Cabin in the Sky (Vernon Duke, John La Touche) – 2:57
"Angel Eyes" from Jennifer (Matt Dennis, Earl Brent) – 4:19

1996 CD bonus track
The album's first compact disc release in 1996 included one bonus track that was previously unavailable:
"I'm Glad There Is You" (Jimmy Dorsey, Paul Madeira)  – 3:43

2017 CD bonus tracks
The album's CD release as part of the 2017 box set The Voice of Romance: The Columbia Original Album Collection included "I'm Glad There Is You" and one other track, which had not been available before:
"Out of This World" (Harold Arlen, Johnny Mercer) – 2:43

Track listing (UK)

Side one
"Wild Is the Wind" from Wild Is the Wind (Dimitri Tiomkin, Ned Washington) – 2:24
"Easy to Love" (Cole Porter) – 2:29
"Street of Dreams" (Victor Young, Sam M. Lewis) – 2:15
"Love, Your Magic Spell Is Everywhere" (Edmund Goulding, Elsie Janis) – 2:59
"Prelude to a Kiss" (Duke Ellington, Irving Mills, Irving Gordon) – 4:26
"No Love (But Your Love)" (Billy Myles) – 2:19

Side two
"Come to Me" (Robert Allen, Peter Lind Hayes) – 3:05
"In Other Words (Fly Me to the Moon)" (Bart Howard) – 3:52
"Star Eyes" (Don Raye, Gene DePaul) – 2:48
"It Might As Well Be Spring" (Richard Rodgers, Oscar Hammerstein II) – 4:47
"When I Am with You" (Al Stillman, Ben Weisman) – 2:59
"The Twelfth of Never" (Jerry Livingston, Paul Francis Webster) – 2:26

Recording dates and personnel
The 1996 CD and 2017 box set provided the session dates. The musicians for each song were listed on the back cover of the original album and in the liner notes of the box set.
March 14, 1956 – "Out of This World", "Street of Dreams"
 Teo Macero – arranger, conductor 
 Art Farmer – trumpet 
 Eddie Bert – trombone 
 Don Butterfield – tuba 
 Danny Bank – flute and baritone sax 
 John La Porta – clarinet and alto sax 
 Wally Cirillo – piano 
 Milt Hinton – bass 
 Ed Shaughnessy – drums 
March 15, 1956 – "Angel Eyes", "Star Eyes"
 Bob Prince – arranger, conductor; vibraphone and bongo drums 
 Nick Travis – trumpet 
 Al Richman – French horn 
 Phil Woods – alto sax 
 Sol Schlinger – baritone sax 
 Gerry Citron – piano 
  Teddy Kotick – bass 
  Joe Harris – drums 
March 19, 1956 – "Autumn in Rome", "Cabin in the Sky", "I'm Glad There Is You"
 Manny Albam – arranger, conductor 
 Bernie Glow – trumpet 
 Ray Beckenstein – flute 
 Ben Harrod – oboe 
 Hal McKusick – clarinet and alto sax 
 Danny Bank – bass clarinet 
 Ed Costa – piano and vibraphone 
 Barry Galbraith – guitar 
 Milt Hinton – bass 
 Osie Johnson – drums 
March 21, 1956 – "Easy to Love", "It Might As Well Be Spring", "Love, Your Magic Spell Is Everywhere"
 Gil Evans – arranger, conductor 
 Jimmy Maxwell – first trumpet 
 Buck Clayton – second trumpet and solos 
 J. J. Johnson – trombone 
 Tom Mitchell – bass trombone 
 John La Porta – alto sax 
 Hank Jones – piano 
 Bill Pemberton – bass 
 Billy Exiner – drums 
  The ending of "It Might As Well Be Spring" was transcribed by Evans from a trio arrangement made for Mathis by Jerry Cournoyer. 
March 23, 1956 – "Babalu", "Caravan"
 Teo Macero – arranger, conductor 
 Nick Travis – trumpet 
 Eddie Bert – trombone 
 Hal McKusick – clarinet and alto sax 
 Danny Bank – flute and baritone sax 
 Gerry Citron – piano 
 Teddy Kotick – bass 
 Joe Harris – drums 
 Bob Prince – bongo drums and percussion 
April 6, 1956 – "In Other Words (Fly Me to the Moon)", "Prelude to a Kiss"
 John Lewis – arranger, conductor; piano 
 Robert Di Domenica – flute 
 James Pellerite – flute 
 Harry Shulman – oboe 
 A. J. Sciacca – clarinet 
 Hal McKusick – clarinet 
 Jack Kreiselman – bass clarinet 
 Manuel Zegler – bassoon 
 Gunther Schuller – French horn 
 George Nadal – French horn 
 John Barber – tuba 
 Janet Putnam – harp 
 Herb Ellis – guitar 
 Ray Brown – bass 
 Connie Kay – drums 
 Unused recordings
The liner notes for the 1996 release of the album on compact disc include a list of the songs that were also recorded at these sessions but went unused and were destroyed in 1958:
March 14, 1956 – "I Love You"
March 15, 1956 – "Will You Still Be Mine", "Just Friends"
March 19, 1956 – "I Married an Angel", "You Are Too Beautiful"
March 21, 1956 – "Stella by Starlight", "When Your Lover Has Gone"
March 23, 1956 – "Will You Still Be Mine", "The Lady Is a Tramp", "Flamingo"
April 6, 1956 – "Easy Living", "The Song Is You"

References

Bibliography

1956 debut albums
Jazz albums by American artists
Johnny Mathis albums
Columbia Records albums
Albums produced by George Avakian
Albums recorded at CBS 30th Street Studio